Köprübaşı (literally "bridgehead") is a Turkish place name and may refer to the following places:

Köprübaşı, Ezine
Köprübaşı, Kale
Köprübaşı, Kargı
Köprübaşı, Mecitözü
Köprübaşı, Manisa, a district of Manisa Province, Turkey
Köprübaşı, Olur
Köprübaşı, Sarayköy
Köprübaşı, Tercan
Köprübaşı, Trabzon, a district of Trabzon Province, Turkey
Köprübaşı, Anamur, a village in Anamur district of Mersin Province, Turkey
 Köprübaşı, Mengen, a village in Mengen district of Bolu Province, Turkey
 Köprübaşı, Sason, a village in Sason district of Batman Province, Turkey
 Köprübaşı, Vezirköprü, a village in Vezirköprü district of Samsun Province, Turkey
 Köprübaşı Dam, in Zonguldak Province, Turkey